De Neve Square Park is an urban pocket park located in the neighborhood of Holmby Hills in West Los Angeles, Los Angeles, California. It is located at the northern terminus of Mapleton Drive where it meets Saint Pierre Road at Beverly Glen Boulevard, where Holmby Hills borders East Gate Bel Air to the west. The trapezoidal (rather than square) park is ringed by mature sycamore trees as well as English-style street lamps from the 1920s (created exclusively for Holmby Hills). De Neve Square Park is one of two parks in Holmby Hills (the other being Holmby Park).

De Neve Square Park is dedicated to the memory of Felipe de Neve, regarded as the founder of Los Angeles in 1781.

History
De Neve Square Park has a very prominent history as the location of Elvis Presley's regular organized touch-football games during the 1950s and 60s when he was residing in Los Angeles making films.

See also
List of parks in Los Angeles

References

Municipal parks in California
Urban public parks
Parks in Los Angeles
Holmby Hills, Los Angeles